Spirit Technology Solutions is an Australian information technology and telecommunications company based in South Melbourne, Victoria. The company was founded in 2005 by Geoff Neate and Joe Tigal.

History
Spirit Technology Solutions was founded in 2005 by Geoff Neate and Joe Tigal. In 2012, the company acquired Melbourne-based ISP Voxcom.

In June 2016, Spirit was listed on the Australian Stock Exchange as ST1. In 2018, the company signed a $1.7 million deal with the Victorian Government to provide internet to Horsham.

In 2021, Spirit acquired Brisbane-based security services firm Intalock.

References

Telecommunications companies of Australia